The Hermetic Brotherhood of Light was a Fraternity that descended from the Fratres Lucis in the late 18th century (in turn, derived from the German Order of the Golden and Rosy Cross), and was the seed from which Ordo Templi Orientis (O.T.O.) ('Order of the Temple of the East' or 'Order of Oriental Templars') was created. 

Carl Kellner and Paschal Beverly Randolph were members of the Hermetic Brotherhood of Light. In Theodor Reuss' 1917 O.T.O. Constitution, it states in Article 1, Section 1:

Sources
Godwin, Joscelyn. (1990). "The Brotherhood of Light." Theosophical History, Vol. III, No. 3.
Greenfield, Allen (1997). The Story of the Hermetic Brotherhood of Light. Looking Glass Press. .
Greenfield, Allen. (2003) Hermetic Brotherhood Revisited. Luxor Press. .

Hermeticism
Secret societies in the United States